Boukhanfar is a village in the Boumerdès Province in Kabylie, Algeria.

Location
The village is surrounded by Keddache River and the towns of Thenia and Zemmouri in the Khachna mountain range.

History
This village has experienced the facts of several historical events:
Expedition of the Col des Beni Aïcha (1837)
Battle of the Col des Beni Aïcha (1871)

Notable people

References

Villages in Algeria
Boumerdès Province
Kabylie